Esfenvalerate is a synthetic pyrethroid insecticide marketed under the brand Asana.  It is the (S)-enantiomer of fenvalerate.

In the United States, a limit of .05 ppm of the chemical's residue is permissible in food.

References

Insecticides
Nitriles
Chloroarenes